Naval Air Weapons Station China Lake is a United States military facility in California.

China Lake may also refer to:

Places in the United States
China Lake, Kern County, California, an unincorporated community named for a nearby dry lake 
China Lake Acres, California, a census-designated place (CDP)
China Lake (Maine), a pond in Kennebec County

Other uses
China Lake (film), a 1983 thriller film
China Lake Grenade Launcher, developed at the military facility
China Lake, a 1992 novel by Anthony Hyde
 The China Lake Murders, a 1990 film